Robert Emmett Bledsoe Baylor (May 10, 1793 – January 6, 1874) was an ordained Baptist minister, slave owner, district judge, politician and co-founder of Baylor University.

Early life
Baylor was born on May 10, 1793, in Lincoln County, Kentucky, to Walker and Jane Bledsoe Baylor. Baylor attended schools around Paris, Kentucky. He served in the Kentucky militia during the War of 1812. After the war, he studied law under his uncle Jesse Bledsoe and practiced law in Kentucky.  He was briefly a member of the Kentucky House of Representatives from 1819 to 1820, before he resigned and moved to Alabama.

In Alabama, he practiced law and continued his political career.  In 1824, he was elected to the Alabama House of Representatives.  Baylor was elected as a Jacksonian to the Twenty-first Congress (March 4, 1829 – March 3, 1831) from Alabama's 2nd congressional district and was an unsuccessful candidate for election in 1830 to the Twenty-second Congress. In 1836, Baylor fought as a lieutenant colonel against the Creek tribe in the Creek War of 1836. In 1839, he converted to Christianity and was ordained a Baptist minister.

Texas career
In 1839, Baylor moved to La Grange, Texas. He quickly made a name for himself in Texas law as judge of the Third Judicial District of the Congress of the Republic of Texas, and was appointed to the Supreme Court of the Republic of Texas as an associate justice in 1841, a position he would hold until the annexation of Texas in 1845. After Texas attained statehood, Baylor was appointed by Governor J. P. Henderson as judge over the Third Judicial District of the new state, a position he would hold until his retirement in 1863. He lived the remainder of his life in Gay Hill, Texas.

Baylor was one of the first officers of the Texas Baptist Educational Society and, in 1844, along with Reverend William Tryon and Reverend James Huckins, sent a petition to the Congress of the Republic of Texas asking the nation to charter a Baptist university. In response to this petition, The Republic of Texas produced an Act of Congress that was signed on February 1, 1845, by Anson Jones, providing the charter that yielded Baylor University and, later, the University of Mary Hardin-Baylor.

In the 1850s, Baylor was an influential leader in the Nativist Texas Know Nothing Party and was named the Texas Know Nothing Party's "Grand President." During the Civil War, Baylor supported the Confederacy and the grounds of Baylor University, then in Independence, were used as a training and staging ground for the Confederate Army. Baylor's nephew, John R. Baylor, was a prominent leader in the Confederacy serving as both a governor and later as a member of the Confederate Congress.

In his role as a judge, he once punished an abolitionist harboring an escaped slave. Another man was punished for not returning a borrowed slave promptly. In 1854, Judge Baylor sentenced a slave to hang for arson. In 1856, he ordered the execution of yet another slave. In 1857, he levied a heavy fine on a white person who bought some bacon from a slave. And in 1862, as the Civil War raged, he ordered the execution of a slave for “intent to rape a white female.”

Baylor was a slave owner. A report commissioned by Baylor University found that of 1856, he owned four slaves; the 1860 Census records him as owning 33 slaves.

Personal life
Baylor was a Mason from 1825 until his death. He never married and had no children, although he was close to his nephew John Baylor.

He died on January 6, 1874, and was buried in Independence, Texas, on the original site of Baylor University. In 1917, his remains were exhumed and transferred to the University of Mary Hardin-Baylor in Belton, Texas.

References

External links

Robert E.B. Baylor at Biographical Directory of The United States Congress

1793 births
1874 deaths
Texas state court judges
Members of the Alabama House of Representatives
Members of the Kentucky House of Representatives
University and college founders
People from Kentucky in the War of 1812
Jacksonian members of the United States House of Representatives from Alabama
19th-century American politicians
People from Lincoln County, Kentucky
American Freemasons
Justices of the Republic of Texas Supreme Court
Baptists from Kentucky
Baptists from Texas
Baylor University founders
Baylor University people
Southern Baptist ministers
19th-century American clergy